Levi C. Scott (1797–1890) was a politician in the Oregon Territory of the United States in the 1850s. A native of Illinois, he was a captain during the Cayuse War, helped lay the Applegate Trail, served in the Oregon Territorial Legislature, and in 1857 was a member of the Oregon Constitutional Convention. Scott also founded Scottsburg, Oregon, and is the namesake for several natural features in Southern Oregon.

Early life
Levi Scott was born on February 8, 1797, in what would become the state of Illinois. He was married and had two children, and by 1844, he had moved to Iowa and was living in Burlington. In May 1844, Levi and his son John Scott (b. 1828) immigrated to what was then Oregon Country and settled near Dallas, Oregon.

Political career
In 1846, Scott, along with his son, as well as Jesse Applegate, Lindsay Applegate and others, set off to create a southern route into the Willamette Valley. The route authorized by the Provisional Government of Oregon would travel southwest from Fort Hall and cross the Rogue Valley and Umpqua Valley before turning north to the Willamette Valley settlements. This Southern Route has become known as the Applegate Trail.

During the Cayuse War Scott was made a captain and was responsible for sending dispatches for the Provisional Government south to California. Following his involvement in the war, he settled in 1848 along Elm Creek in Douglas County, Oregon, with the valley named Scotts Valley in his honor. In 1850, Scott founded Scottsburg, Oregon along the Umpqua River. Mount Scott in Crater Lake National Park in Southern Oregon is also named after Levi.

Scott then entered the political field when he was elected to the Oregon Territorial Legislature in 1852. He represented three southern counties, Umpqua, Douglas and Jackson as a Whig in the upper chamber Council. Scott won re-election twice, serving through the 1854-55 session. He returned to politics briefly in 1857 as a delegate to the Oregon Constitutional Convention. Scott represented Umpqua County as an Anti-Democrat.

Later life
He died in Malheur County, Oregon, in the Southeastern part of the state on April 21, 1890. In addition to the town, valley, and mountain named after him, Scott Mountain in Douglas County is also named after Levi.

References

Further reading
 Wagons to the Willamette: Captain Levi Scott and the Southern Route to Oregon, 1844-1847 by Levi Scott and James Layton Collins, edited by Stafford J. Hazelett, 2015, Washington State University Press (memoir in modern edition)

Members of the Oregon Constitutional Convention
Members of the Oregon Territorial Legislature
19th-century American politicians
People from Monroe County, Illinois
1797 births
1890 deaths
Oregon pioneers
Oregon Whigs
People from Burlington, Iowa
People from Scottsburg, Oregon